NASA Federal Credit Union is a credit union founded in 1949 and is headquartered in Upper Marlboro, Maryland. It holds more than $3 billion in assets, and is insured by the National Credit Union Administration. The credit union has about 200,000 members, nationwide. It had been named Best-in-State credit union in Maryland in 2018 and 2019 by Forbes.

History 
NASA Federal Credit union was founded as the NACA Washington Federal Credit Union in 1949 by a group of employees from the National Advisory Committee for Aeronautics (NACA). As the agency changed its name from NACA to the National Aeronautics and Space Administration (NASA), in 1958, the credit union also changed its name to NASA Washington Federal Credit Union. In 1974, it finalized the name to NASA Federal Credit Union. NASA Federal Credit Union merged with The Partnership Federal Credit Union on October 1, 2019, growing NASA Federal's membership and adding two additional branches, one in Arlington, VA and another in Alexandria, VA.

Membership 
In order to join NASA Federal, an applicant must be a NASA employee, relative or retiree, or a member of one of 900 partner companies or associations.  Below is a list of associations one can be a part of to become a member of NASA Federal. 
 American Association for the Advancement of Science 
 American Astronautical Society
 American Geophysical Union
 American Institute of Architects – Washington Chapter (AIADC)
 American Society for Microbiology
 Consumer Electronics Association
 The Mars Society 
 Mathematical Association of America
 Moon Society
 National Space Society
 Road Runners Club - Montgomery County, MD - (MCRRC.org)
 Women in Aerospace (WIA)  
 The Business Forum for HR Professionals

In addition, ATM fees are waived when members use NASA Federal's 53,000 partner credit unions throughout the U.S.

Products 
Credit unions have been mentioned in media outlets about their competitive products, particularly on auto rates, mortgages and CDs as compared to larger banks. NASA Federal has been named in several publications as a recommended credit union to use for a variety of products.

Credit cards 
NASA Federal offers a fixed rate 8.9% balance transfer to those who've opened an account within 90 days. These cards have been mentioned by well-known finance websites such as NerdWallet, who published an article describing the benefits of the credit cards.

Star Trek Credit Card 
NASA Federal launched its Star Trek credit card program in August 2016, in partnership with CBS (a subsidiary of Paramount Global, formerly ViacomCBS) and in conjunction with Star Trek's 50-year anniversary.  The program offers four Platinum Advantage Rewards cards including imagery from the Starfleet Academy, United Federation of Planets, Captain's Card, and Starfleet Command. The cards offer rewards of Star Trek merchandise and experiences.  The card also offers a 9.9% APR on balance transfers for life, the same across all NASA Federal credit cards.

Auto Loans 
According to The Wall Street Journal, credit unions are particularly competitive on auto loans, with the average credit-union rates on eight types of auto loans beating the comparable bank figures by an average of two percentage points. NASA Federal currently has a similar promotion that competes to lower an applicant's monthly payment.

Certificates 
NASA Federal offers certificates (which are comparable to CDs). They have been mentioned in The Wall Street Journal as a way to achieve membership to credit unions.

Mortgages 
NASA Federal offers zero-down mortgages up to $650,000 with no private mortgage insurance plus a $1,000 "lender credit" toward closing costs if the home purchase doesn't go to settlement by the contract date.

In 2020, NASA Federal originated 1,166 mortgages worth a total of $337 million.

Community outreach

Children's Miracle Network 
Each year, NASA Federal volunteers and participates as runners, raising thousands of dollars for the Children's Miracle Network through an annual event called the Credit Union Cherry Blossom 10 mile run. Nearly 20,000 runners in total participate in this event.

Scholarships 
NASA Federal awards scholarships to DC-area high school students through the Mitchell-Beall-Rosen Memorial Scholarship Contest. The annual program rewards the writing talents of young Credit Union members who are working toward four-year or two-year undergraduate degrees or vocational studies.

The Scholarship Program was established in 1983 in memory of Wilfred Mitchell and then renamed in 1991 to also honor Donald Beall. Both men are former NASA Federal Credit Union officials.

References 

1949 establishments in Maryland
Credit unions based in Maryland
Banks established in 1949
Companies based in Prince George's County, Maryland